Highgate is a suburb of Adelaide in the City of Unley. It is surrounded by Fullarton and Malvern.

History
European settlers arrived in the area in 1839 and surveyed. Part of section 251, Hundred of Adelaide, was purchased by William Ferguson, who named the 248 acres (100 hectares) Rosefield after his wife Rosina Ferguson.

Some time before 1854 a  section was purchased by George White (1813–1876), tailor of Hindley Street and owner of "White's Rooms", who lived there with his family. He established a large formal garden and developed  as a vineyard. By 1875 his cellars had  storage in wood, and in that year produced . White died in 1876, and his widow sold the property, which in September 1881 was laid out as Highgate-on-the-Hill by F.J. Botting (1819–1906), naming it after the English town in which he was born.

In 1967 the suburb was renamed Highgate. By 1900 most newspaper advertisements referred simply to "Highgate" and by 1920 references to "Highgate-on-the-Hill" had been dropped entirely.

Buildings 
Rosefield Uniting Church on Carlton Street, Highgate was built in 1968, following the demolition of the second church which was opened on 21 August 1922. An earlier iron church dated from 1911. The church was formerly known as William Jeffries Memorial Methodist Church and became Uniting Church in 1977.

Education
Highgate School in Hampstead Avenue is a Reception to Year 7 school which opened in 1923.
Concordia College is a Lutheran secondary school with 82 teaching staff.

References

Suburbs of Adelaide